Pin Oak Acres is a census-designated place (CDP) in Mayes County, Oklahoma, United States. The population was 427 at the 2000 census.

Geography
Pin Oak Acres is located at  (36.134494, -95.296479). It is southeast of Chouteau and east of U.S. Route 69 on the Neosho River, upstream of Fort Gibson Dam.

Demographics

As of the census of 2000, there were 427 people, 140 households, and 117 families residing in the CDP. The population density was 74.3 people per square mile (28.7/km2). There were 193 housing units at an average density of 33.6/sq mi (13.0/km2). The racial makeup of the CDP was 77.99% White, 1.41% African American, 10.77% Native American, 0.70% Asian, 0.94% from other races, and 8.20% from two or more races. Hispanic or Latino of any race were 2.58% of the population.

There were 140 households, out of which 35.7% had children under the age of 18 living with them, 67.9% were married couples living together, 5.0% had a female householder with no husband present, and 16.4% were non-families. 12.9% of all households were made up of individuals, and 5.7% had someone living alone who was 65 years of age or older. The average household size was 3.05 and the average family size was 3.33.

In the CDP, the population was spread out, with 31.1% under the age of 18, 11.5% from 18 to 24, 25.8% from 25 to 44, 21.5% from 45 to 64, and 10.1% who were 65 years of age or older. The median age was 33 years. For every 100 females, there were 120.1 males. For every 100 females age 18 and over, there were 119.4 males.

The median income for a household in the CDP was $50,577, and the median income for a family was $50,865. Males had a median income of $32,500 versus $19,750 for females. The per capita income for the CDP was $15,361. About 9.4% of families and 14.7% of the population were below the poverty line, including 22.7% of those under age 18 and 44.4% of those age 65 or over.

References

Census-designated places in Mayes County, Oklahoma
Census-designated places in Oklahoma